Sergey Valentinovich Kushchenko (born May 27, 1961 in Novye Lyady, Perm Russia) is the Executive Director of the Russian Biathlon Union, the first vice-president of the International Biathlon Union, and the member of the Board of directors for the Brooklyn Nets.

Biography

Sergey Kushchenko was one of the founders of Ural-Great, a professional basketball club in Perm, Russia. In the late nineties under Sergey’s leadership, Ural-Great grew to be one of the top Russian clubs. From 1995 to 2002 during Kushchenko’s presidency, the team won two Russian championships. 

In 2002, CSKA Moscow recruited Kushenko to lead its organization. Sergey attracted the best coaches and players and introduced many innovations strengthening the club. During the next four years his successful business and sports strategies lifted CSKA to a first-class status among world clubs and put Russia back on the map of great basketball countries.

In 2005, Euroleague included CSKA in the marketing commission, and Kushchenko became part of the Euroleague Council. Shortly afterwards, CSKA won two Euroleague championships.

In 2006, Sergey was appointed the head for the Central Sports Army Club in Moscow which entailed more than forty different sports including hockey, basketball, tennis, swimming, and biathlon.

In 2009, Kushchenko was invited by Mikhail Prokhorov to become CEO of the Russian Biathlon Union. On September 2, 2010 Kushchenko was elected as the first vice-president of the International Biathlon Union. In May 2011 he was appointed to the New Jersey Nets Board of directors.

Achievements
Honors and Decorations:
 2007 The Order of Honour Russian Federation

Awards and Titles
 2006 EuroLeague Club Executive of the Year Award

References

External links

1961 births
Living people
Biathlon in Russia
Brooklyn Nets